Barbara Luna is an Argentine singer, born in Roque Pérez, Buenos Aires Province to a musical family. She studied architecture in Argentina, then moved to France. She has lived and worked in France since the 1990s.

Career
Luna's music is inspired by Native American, traditional African, salsa, and tango influences. She has appeared in World of Music, Arts and Dance, an international arts touring festival.

Discography
 1998 A la vida a la muerte
 2001India Morena 
 2006 Somos 
 2007 Live à Athènes
 2009 Ruta Tres

See also

 List of Argentine musicians
 List of singers

References

External links
 

Year of birth missing (living people)
20th-century births
20th-century Argentine women singers
Living people
People from Buenos Aires Province
21st-century Argentine women singers